David Alexander Renneberg (born 23 September 1942) is a former Australian cricketer who played in eight Test matches from 1966 to 1968.

Born to parents of German ancestry, Renneberg played for New South Wales from 1964–65 to 1970–71. He played a season for Rawtenstall in the Lancashire League in 1969.

References

External links

1942 births
Living people
Australia Test cricketers
New South Wales cricketers
Australian cricketers
Cricketers from Sydney
Australian people of German descent